David Ochoa is an American Magic: The Gathering player and longtime member of Team ChannelFireball. Although a Vintage specialist, Ochoa has experienced success at the Magic: the Gathering Pro Tour, with a top 8 finish at Pro Tour Return to Ravnica as well as five Grand Prix top 8 finishes.

Achievements

References 

Living people
American Magic: The Gathering players
Year of birth missing (living people)